Guatemala is a country in Central America bordered by Mexico to the north and west, the Pacific Ocean to the southwest, Belize to the northeast, the Caribbean to the east, Honduras to the east and El Salvador to the southeast. Gross Domestic Product (GDP) in purchasing power parity (PPP) in 2010 was estimated at US$70.15 billion. The service sector is the largest component of GDP at 63%, followed by the industry sector at 23.8% and the agriculture sector at 13.2% (2010 est.). Mines produce gold, silver, zinc, cobalt and nickel. The agricultural sector accounts for about two-fifths of exports, and half of the labor force. Organic coffee, sugar, textiles, fresh vegetables, and bananas are the country's main exports. Inflation was 3.9% in 2010.

Notable firms 
This list includes notable companies with primary headquarters located in the country. The industry and sector follow the Industry Classification Benchmark taxonomy. Organizations which have ceased operations are included and noted as defunct.

See also 

 List of airlines of Guatemala

References 

Guatemala